John James Stansbury (December 6, 1885 – December 26, 1970) was a third baseman in Major League Baseball who played briefly for the Boston Red Sox during the  season. He was born in Phillipsburg, New Jersey.

In his one-season career, Stansbury was a .128 hitter (6 for 47) in 20 games, including three runs, one double, and two RBI.
 
Stansbury died at age 85 in Easton, Pennsylvania.

Fact
Was a member of the 1918 American League champions Red Sox, although he did not play in the World Series.

External links
Baseball Reference
Retrosheet

1885 births
1970 deaths
Major League Baseball third basemen
Boston Red Sox players
Minor league baseball managers
Nazareth (minor league baseball) players
Williamsport Millionaires players
Louisville Colonels (minor league) players
New Orleans Pelicans (baseball) players
Newark Bears (IL) players
Beaumont Exporters players
Houston Buffaloes players
Shreveport Sports players
Palestine Pals players
Tyler Trojans players
Texarkana Twins players
Baseball players from New Jersey
People from Phillipsburg, New Jersey
Sportspeople from Warren County, New Jersey